Michael Parr (born 6 August 1986) is a British actor, known for playing the part of Ross Barton in the ITV soap opera Emmerdale. and Billy Parker in Channel 4 soap opera, Hollyoaks.

Life and early career
Parr was born in Saint Helens, Merseyside. His mother is American and he holds dual US and British nationality, enabling him to work in the US without the need of a Green Card if he so wished. He trained at the Elizabeth Hill School of Dance and Drama in Saint Helens, and East 15 Acting School in Essex, graduating in 2008. Prior to getting the part in Emmerdale, Parr worked between acting jobs as a Learning Support Assistant in a Special Educational Needs school. He had previously worked as a barman.

Previous television appearances include Good Cop, Inside Men and Hollyoaks. Film roles include Queesnbury Rules, No Way Through, and Keiren in the 2014 film Territory. Parr has also appeared on stage in various roles, including Justin in Studies for A Portrait at the Oval House Theatre and Danny in Twothousandandsex at the Drill Hall in London.

Emmerdale

Parr made his first appearance in the ITV soap Emmerdale in July 2013, playing an unnamed man who carjacked regular character Laurel Thomas (Charlotte Bellamy). It was only after his return to the show in October 2013 that his true identity was revealed. His character, Ross Barton, is one of three sons of James Barton (Bill Ward), and the nephew of regular character Moira Barton (Natalie J Robb).

During his time in Emmerdale, Parr has been involved in a number of high-profile storylines, including an affair with policewoman Donna Windsor (Verity Rushworth); taking part in a violent robbery at Home Farm; an illicit affair with his brother's fiancée (later wife), Debbie Dingle (Charley Webb); and secretly fathering a child with Debbie's mother Charity Macey (Emma Atkins). In 2018, Ross Barton was the victim of an acid attack, leaving the character badly scarred. Parr has described the storyline as challenging.

In October 2015, Parr won awards for Best Actor, Best Bad Boy and Sexiest Male at the 2015 Inside Soap Awards. Emmerdale also won Best Soap.

In early 2018 it was announced that would be leaving Emmerdale later in the year. He has suggested he would like to work in the U.S.

Filmography

Television

Film

References

External links

Michael Parr on Twitter

Living people
Alumni of East 15 Acting School
British people of American descent
People from St Helens, Merseyside
English male soap opera actors
1986 births